Application Lifecycle Framework (ALF) was an Eclipse Foundation project to develop an open framework for system integration and interoperability for application lifecycle management tools. The project failed to gain the support of significant vendors and was terminated in 2008.

See also

 ISO/IEC 12207, this is an international standard for software lifecycle processes

References

External links
 About Application lifecycle framework
 Application lifecycle framework FAQ
 Eclipse Application Lifecycle Framework (ALF) project, Project Archival Review, November 12, 2008
 A new approach for (product) lifecycle development based on ALF, 2021

Eclipse (software)
Programming tools